Daqiao is a town in Xiushui County, Jiujiang, Jiangxi province, China. , it has one residential community and 16 villages under its administration.

See also 
 List of township-level divisions of Jiangxi

References 

Township-level divisions of Jiangxi
Xiushui County